Thomas Tyndall KCB (1723–1794) was a Bristol merchant and banker with extensive slave trade connections.

Tyndall was the son of Onesiphorus Tyndall and Elizabeth Cowles. Tyndall's father had been a founding partner in the Old Bank in Bristol, and Tyndall inherited a considerable legacy on his father's death in 1757. Tyndall also succeeded his father as a partner in the bank. Tyndall's uncle William Tyndall was a slave factor in Jamaica, and owned a plantation with his business partner Richard Assheton.

Tyndall commissioned the Royal Fort House in Tyndalls Park in Bristol, now part of the University of Bristol. The house was built around 1767. 

Tyndall's daughter Caroline married into another family heavily involved in the slave trade, the Brights. 

Bristol University holds a painting of Tyndall and his wife and children, painted by Thomas Beach.

References 

1723 births
1794 deaths
English slave traders
English bankers
British merchants
Date of birth missing
Date of death missing
Place of birth missing
Place of death missing
18th-century English businesspeople